This is a list of parliamentary by-elections in Great Britain held between 1715 and 1734, with the names of the previous incumbent and the victor in the by-election.

In the absence of a comprehensive and reliable source, for party and factional alignments in this period, no attempt is made to define them in this article. The House of Commons: 1715–1754 provides some guidance to the complex and shifting political relationships, but it is significant that the compilers of that work make no attempt to produce a definitive list of each members allegiances.

Resignations
See Resignation from the British House of Commons for more details.

Where the cause of by-election is given as "resignation", this indicates that the incumbent was appointed to an "office of profit under the Crown" causing him to vacate his seat and prohibited membership in the House of Commons. This office is noted in brackets.

In addition certain offices of profit, such as cabinet positions, required the MP to seek re-election. These offices are noted separately.

Dates
During this period England (but not Scotland) counted its legal year as beginning on 25 March. For the purposes of this list the year is considered to have started on 1 January.

By-elections
The c/u column denotes whether the by-election was a contested poll or an unopposed return. If the winner was re-elected, at the next general election and any intermediate by-elections, this is indicated by an * following the c or u. In a few cases the winner was elected at the next general election but had not been re-elected in a by-election after the one noted. In those cases no * symbol is used.

5th Parliament (1715–1722)

6th Parliament (1722–1727)

7th Parliament (1727–1734)

References

 
 Return of the name of every member of the lower house of parliament of England, Scotland, and Ireland, with name of constituency represented, and date of return, from 1213 to 1874.
 The House of Commons 1715–1754, edited by Romney Sedgwick (London : Published for the History of Parliament Trust by H.M.S.O., 1970)

External links
 History of Parliament: Members 1715–1754
 History of Parliament: Constituencies 1715–1754

By-elections to the Parliament of Great Britain
18th century in Great Britain